Bank of Africa (BOA) is a Moroccan banking conglomerate headquartered in Casablanca, Morocco, with banking operations in Morocco and eighteen other African countries. Its main predecessor entities started in 1959 in Morocco and in 1982 in Mali. Until 2020 the group parent entity was known as the Banque Marocaine du Commerce Extérieur (BMCE, ("Moroccan Bank of Foreign Trade"), a name that lingers as "BMCE Group" in the BOA brand identity as of 2022. BOA has offices in Europe, Asia, France, Spain, United Kingdom, China, Italy, Germany, UAE, Belgium, Canada and Netherlands.

History

BMCE was created in 1959, shortly after the country's independence, and listed on the Casablanca Stock Exchange in 1974. In 1995, it was privatized and became controlled by Moroccan businessman Othman Benjelloun through insurer .

BOA's initial bank in Sub-Saharan Africa was established in late 1982, in Bamako, Mali, by local businesspeople. It was formed to address the scarcity of banking services for local businesses and individuals, which was prevalent not only in Mali at that time, but across most of Francophone West Africa. This initial effort was without any external financial backing. The success of BOA Mali, led to the establishment of African Financial Holdings (AFH), as the holding company for BOA Mali in 1988. The objectives of AFH were to promote the establishment of banking subsidiaries across Africa, with local capital participation as a key component and to offer both management, technical support as well as equity participation in these new banking subsidiaries.

Starting in 1990 with BOA Benin, the BOA group started opening subsidiaries across the continent, initially in Francophone countries but eventually in Anglophone Africa, starting with BOA Kenya in 2004. To increase their capital base, AFH took on new investors including the PROPARCO, a division of the French Development Agency, Netherlands Development Finance Company (FMO) and Natexis (later Natixis) of France.

In 2008, AFH rebranded into Bank of Africa Group, and BMCE took a 35% shareholding interest, bringing much needed financial capital and banking expertise. BMCE became majority owner of the BOA group in 2010.

In 2020, BMCE rebranded itself as Bank of Africa. Through successive transactions since 2004, Crédit Mutuel Alliance Fédérale has become the second major shareholder of the group with 25% of the company's equity as of end-2020. The largest shareholder remains Othman Benjelloun at 27.4 percent, through his O Capital holding company and insurance company RMA Watanya.

Member companies

Banking subsidiaries 
BOA had operational bank subsidiaries in the following countries, as of March 2016:

Specialized subsidiaries
The specialized subsidiaries of Bank of Africa Group include the following:

 Banque de l'Habitat du Bénin (BHB)
 Equipbail Benin
 Equipbail Mali
 Equipbail Mada
 Actibourse SA
 Agora SA
 Aissa - BOA's IT company
 Attica SA

Entities of the BOA Group also include :
BMCE Bank International – international business
Meditel – telecom
Medi 1 – radio station
Africa Morocco Link – shipping company

See also

 Attijariwafa Bank
 Banque Populaire (Morocco)
 Ecobank
 Standard Bank
 United Bank for Africa
 Zenith Bank
 List of banks in Morocco

External links
Bank of Africa Group Website

References

Banks of Morocco
Banks established in 1982
 
1982 establishments in Morocco
Companies based in Casablanca